Thomas Smith (born 1856, date of death unknown) was a United States Navy sailor and a recipient of the United States military's highest decoration, the Medal of Honor.

Born in 1856 in Ireland, Smith emigrated to the United States and joined the Navy from Virginia. On that day, while Enterprise was off the coast of Pará, Brazil, he rescued Coxswain William Kent from drowning. For this action, he was awarded the Medal of Honor.

Smith's official Medal of Honor citation reads:
For rescuing from drowning William Kent, coxswain of the U.S.S. Enterprise, off Para, Brazil, 1 October 1878.

See also

List of Medal of Honor recipients during peacetime

References

External links

1856 births
Year of death missing
Irish emigrants to the United States (before 1923)
United States Navy sailors
United States Navy Medal of Honor recipients
Irish-born Medal of Honor recipients
Irish sailors in the United States Navy
Non-combat recipients of the Medal of Honor